The 1994–95 Sporting de Gijón season was the 33rd season of the club in La Liga, the 19th consecutive after its last promotion.

Overview
Sporting avoided the relegation by defeating UE Lleida in the double-legged relegation playoffs. In the second match, Real Sporting won 3–2 and El Molinón registered the highest attendance for a Sporting match.

Things were better in Copa del Rey, where Sporting reached the semifinals, but finally was eliminated by eventual champions Deportivo de La Coruña.

Managerial changes
Mariano García Remón started the season but was sacked after losing 4–0 against Real Madrid. Carlos García Cuervo replaced him until the round 37. Ricardo Rezza was signed for only playing the last round and the relegation playoffs. As the club passed successfully the series, Rezza continued at the helm of the club the next season.

Squad

Competitions

La Liga

Results by round

League table

Matches

Relegation playoffs

Copa del Rey

Matches

Squad statistics

Appearances and goals

|}

References

External links
Profile at BDFutbol
Official website

1994-95
Sporting de Gijon